Nesbitt may refer to:

Places
 Nesbitt, County Durham, mentioned in the List of civil parishes in County Durham, England
 Nesbitt, Manitoba, Canada
 Nesbit, Northumberland, a hamlet and former civil parish near Wooler, in Northumberland, England
 Nesbitt, Northumberland, a former civil parish, now in Stamfordham parish, near Prudhoe, England
 Nesbitt, Texas, United States

Other uses
Nesbitt (surname)
Clan Nesbitt, a Scottish clan
Nesbitt's, an American soft drink brand
A muscadine (Vitis rotundifolia) cultivar

See also
Nesbitt, Thomson and Company, a Canadian stockbrokerage
Nesbitt's inequality, a mathematical inequality
Schuette–Nesbitt formula, a mathematical formula in probability theory
Nesbit (disambiguation)
Nisbet (disambiguation)